FC Metallurg Pikalyovo was a Russian football team from Pikalyovo, Leningrad Oblast. It played professionally in 1968–1969, 1994–1995 and 2003. Their best result was 6th place in Zone 8/RSFSR of the Soviet Second League in 1968.

Team name history
 1968–2001 FC Metallurg Pikalyovo
 2002–2004 FC Pikalyovo
 2005 FC Metallurg Pikalyovo

External links
  Team history at KLISF

Association football clubs established in 1968
Association football clubs disestablished in 2006
Defunct football clubs in Russia
Sport in Leningrad Oblast
1968 establishments in Russia
2006 disestablishments in Russia
Boksitogorsky District